This page lists all described genera and species of the spider family Nicodamidae. , the World Spider Catalog accepts 31 species in 7 genera:

Ambicodamus

Ambicodamus Harvey, 1995
 Ambicodamus audax Harvey, 1995 — Eastern Australia
 Ambicodamus crinitus (L. Koch, 1872) — Australia (New South Wales, Victoria, Tasmania)
 Ambicodamus dale Harvey, 1995 — Australia (Queensland)
 Ambicodamus darlingtoni Harvey, 1995 — Australia (New South Wales)
 Ambicodamus emu Harvey, 1995 — Australia (Queensland)
 Ambicodamus kochi Harvey, 1995 — Australia (Western Australia)
 Ambicodamus leei Harvey, 1995 — Australia (South Australia)
 Ambicodamus marae Harvey, 1995 (type) — Australia (Western Australia)
 Ambicodamus sororius Harvey, 1995 — Australia (Queensland, New South Wales, Victoria, Tasmania)
 Ambicodamus southwelli Harvey, 1995 — Australia (New South Wales, Victoria, Tasmania)
 Ambicodamus urbanus Harvey, 1995 — Australia (New South Wales)

Dimidamus

Dimidamus Harvey, 1995
 Dimidamus arau Harvey, 1995 — New Guinea
 Dimidamus dimidiatus (Simon, 1897) (type) — Australia (Queensland, New South Wales)
 Dimidamus enaro Harvey, 1995 — New Guinea
 Dimidamus leopoldi (Roewer, 1938) — New Guinea
 Dimidamus sero Harvey, 1995 — New Guinea
 Dimidamus simoni Harvey, 1995 — Australia (Victoria)

Durodamus

Durodamus Harvey, 1995
 Durodamus yeni Harvey, 1995 (type) — Australia (Queensland, Victoria, South Australia)

Litodamus

Litodamus Harvey, 1995
 Litodamus collinus Harvey, 1995 — Australia (Tasmania)
 Litodamus hickmani Harvey, 1995 (type) — Australia (Tasmania)
 Litodamus olga Harvey, 1995 — Australia (Tasmania)

Nicodamus

Nicodamus Simon, 1887
 Nicodamus mainae Harvey, 1995 — Australia (Western Australia, South Australia)
 Nicodamus peregrinus (Walckenaer, 1841) (type) — Eastern Australia

Novodamus

Novodamus Harvey, 1995
 Novodamus nodatus (Karsch, 1878) (type) — Australia (New South Wales, Victoria, Tasmania)
 Novodamus supernus Harvey, 1995 — Australia (New South Wales)

Oncodamus

Oncodamus Harvey, 1995
 Oncodamus bidens (Karsch, 1878) (type) — Australia (New South Wales)
 Oncodamus decipiens Harvey, 1995 — Australia (Queensland, New South Wales)

References

Nicodamidae
Nicodamidae